Saïd Omar Oili (born 20 June 1957) was the president of the General Council of Mayotte from 8 April 2004 to 19 March 2008. He has been mayor of Dzaoudzi since 2014 (reelected in 2020).

References

Living people
Presidents of the General Council of Mayotte
1957 births
Mayotte politicians
People from Mayotte